This is a list of professional architecture organizations listed by country. Many of them are members of the International Union of Architects.

Africa

Ghana
 Ghana Institute of Architects

Kenya
Architectural Association of Kenya

Nigeria
Nigerian Institute of Architects

South Africa
South Africa Institute of Architects

Asia

Bangladesh
Institute of Architects Bangladesh

Hong Kong 
 Hong Kong Institute of Architects (HKIA)

India
 Council of Architecture (Coa)
 Indian Institute of Architects (IIA)

Japan
 Architectural Institute of Japan (AIJ)
 Japan Institute of Architects (JIA)

Pakistan
 Institute of Architects Pakistan

Philippines
United Architects of the Philippines

Europe

Denmark
 Architects' Association of Denmark (Akademisk Arkitektforening) (AA), founded 1879

Finland
Suomen Arkkitehtiliitto SAFA

Germany
 Bund Deutscher Architekten

Greece
 Technical Chamber of Greece

Ireland
The Royal Institute of the Architects of Ireland

Netherlands 

 Netherlands Architecture Institute

Poland 

 Association of Polish Architects

Spain
Consejo Superior de los Colegios de Arquitectos de España

United Kingdom
 Royal Institute of British Architects (RIBA)
 Chartered Institute of Architectural Technologists (CIAT)
 Royal Incorporation of Architects in Scotland (RIAS)
 Royal Society of Architects in Wales (RSAW)
 Royal Society of Ulster Architects  (RSUA)
 North Wales Society of Architects (NWSA)

North America

Canada
 Royal Architectural Institute of Canada
 Architectural Institute of British Columbia
 Ontario Association of Architects
 Ordre des architects du Quebec

United States
The American Institute of Architects
The Society of American Registered Architects

Oceania

Australia
Australian Institute of Architects

News Zealand
New Zealand Institute of Architects

References

Architecture
Professional organizations